Sociedade Boca Júnior Futebol Clube, commonly known as Boca Júnior, is a Brazilian football club based in Cristinápolis, Sergipe state. The women's team competed in the Copa do Brasil twice.

History
The club was founded on 25 October 1993, and has its name and colors in homage to Argentine club Boca Juniors.

Men's team
Boca Júnior won the Campeonato Sergipano Série A2 in 2004, when they beat América in the final, and in 2007, when they beat São Domingos in the final, and Boca Júnior's Rivanílton was the competition's top goal scorer with six goals.

Women's team
They competed in the Copa do Brasil for the first time in 2008, when they were eliminated in the First Round by Parnamirim. Boca Júnior competed again in 2010, when they were eliminated in the First Round by Vitória das Tabocas, from Pernambuco state.

Achievements

 Campeonato Sergipano Série A2:
 Winners (2): 2004, 2007

Stadium
The club play their home games at Estádio Governador Augusto Franco, nicknamed Francão. The stadium has a maximum capacity of 2,000 people.

References

External links 

 Sociedade Boca Júnior Futebol Clube at Soccerway

Association football clubs established in 1993
Football clubs in Sergipe
Women's football clubs in Brazil
1993 establishments in Brazil